Mark Paterson is a British sound engineer. In 2013, Paterson won the Academy Award for Best Sound Mixing at the 85th Academy Awards for his work on Les Misérables. He has worked on more than 120 films since 2004.

Selected filmography
 Les Misérables (2012)

References

External links
 

Year of birth missing (living people)
Living people
British audio engineers
Best Sound Mixing Academy Award winners
Best Sound BAFTA Award winners
Place of birth missing (living people)
Primetime Emmy Award winners